The Gadsar Lake, also called the valley of flowers, is a picturesque, alpine high altitude oligotrophic lake is close to Sonamarg & Ganderbal town in Ganderbal district of Kashmir valley in Jammu and Kashmir, India at an elevation of . It has a maximum length of 0.85 km and maximum width of 0.76 km.

Etymology, geography

Gadsar in Kashmiri means the lake of fishes, a natural habitat of trout and other types of fishes among of which is the brown trout. Yemsar means Lake of Yama. The lake freezes in the month of November to April and is mostly covered by snow during these months, the floating ice bergs are seen even in summer. It is surrounded by alpine meadows full of various kinds of wild alpine flowers, therefore the lake is also called as the valley of flowers. The lake is mainly fed by melting of glaciers. The Gadsar Lake outflows through a stream flows north westwards and joins Neelum River at Tulail.

Access 
The Gadsar Lake is situated 108 kilometres northeast from Srinagar city. From Naranag a 28 km alpine track leads to the lake. Another track of 41 km northwest from Shitkadi Sonamarg via Vishansar Lake and Krishansar Lake leads to the Gadsar Lake crossing two mountain passes of Nichnai and Gadsar of more than 4100 meters above sea level. The best time to visit is from the month of June to September.

Gadsar, the lake of death
The Gadsar Lake is also called Yemsar which means the lake of Yama and is also referred to as the lake of death. A myth still unresolved. Shepherds grazing their flocks in the outskirts of Gadsar lake during summers believe that, there lives a Lake Monster, a freshwater Octopus which drags the creatures from shores by its tentacles into the water. There is an uncertainty in the minds of visitors, a kind of threat which prevents them going near the shores. The shepherds also chose otherwise grazing their flocks at the shores of the lake. The fishes are being caught outside the lake in a stream from which it flows out.

References

External links

 Lake and around

Geography of Ganderbal district
Lakes of Jammu and Kashmir
Tourist attractions in Ganderbal district